Dixit Dominus is a psalm setting by George Frideric Handel (catalogued as HWV 232).  It uses the Latin text of Psalm 110 (Vulgate 109), which begins with the words Dixit Dominus ("The Lord Said").

The work was completed in April 1707 while Handel was living in Italy. It is Handel's earliest surviving autograph. The work was written in the baroque style of the period and is scored for five vocal soloists (SSATB), five-part chorus, strings and continuo.  It is thought that the work was first performed on 16 July 1707 in the Church of Santa Maria in Montesanto, under the patronage of the Colonna family.

The score was published in 1867.  A typical performance lasts a little over 30 minutes.

Movements 

The work has the following movements:

See also
 List of compositions by George Frideric Handel

External links
 
 

Compositions by George Frideric Handel
Psalm settings
Choral compositions
1707 compositions